Molly Fleming House is a historic building in California, Pennsylvania.

It is designated as a historic residential landmark/farmstead by the Washington County History & Landmarks Foundation.

References

External links
[ National Register nomination]

Houses on the National Register of Historic Places in Pennsylvania
Queen Anne architecture in Pennsylvania
Houses completed in 1912
Houses in Washington County, Pennsylvania
1912 establishments in Pennsylvania
National Register of Historic Places in Washington County, Pennsylvania
Bungalow architecture in Pennsylvania
American Craftsman architecture in Pennsylvania